Leonardo Andrés Saavedra Salazar (born 3 January 1989) is a Chilean former footballer.

Club career
He played for O'Higgins from 2009 to 2012.

International career
He represented Chile U23 at the 2008 Inter Continental Cup in Malaysia.

Honours

Player
Deportes Antofagasta
 Primera B (1): 2011 Apertura

References

External links

Leonardo Saavedra at Football Lineups

1989 births
Living people
People from Rancagua
Chilean footballers
Association football forwards
C.D. Antofagasta footballers
O'Higgins F.C. footballers
Provincial Osorno footballers
Chilean Primera División players
Primera B de Chile players